The ʿAsir Region is a region of Saudi Arabia located in the southwest of the country that is named after the ʿAsīr tribe. It is surrounded by Mecca Province to the north and west, Al-Bahah Province to the northwest, Riyadh Province to the northeast, Jazan Province to the south, and Najran Province to the southeast. ʿAsir also shares a short border with the Saada Governorate of Yemen to the south.

The capital of the ʿAsir Region is Abha. Other towns include Khamis Mushait, Bisha and Bareq. The regional governor is Turki bin Talal bin Abdul Aziz Al Saud (appointed 27 December 2018), a son of Prince Talal bin Abdulaziz Al Saud. He replaced his cousin, Faisal bin Khalid bin Abdulaziz Al Saud, on the same day.

Geography 

The ʿAsir Region is situated on a high plateau that receives more rainfall than the rest of the country and contains the country's highest peaks, which rise to almost  at Jabal Sawda near Abha. It falls in two rainy seasons, the chief one being in March and April, with some rain in the summer. Temperatures are very extreme, with diurnal temperature ranges in the highlands the greatest in the world. As a result, there is much more natural vegetation in ʿAsir than in any other part of Saudi Arabia, with sheltered areas even containing areas of dense coniferous forests, though more exposed ridges still are very dry.

ʿAsir is home to many farmers who chiefly grow wheat and fruit crops. Irrigation has greatly expanded production in modern times.

Asir National Park was established in 1981, and extends from the Red Sea coast through the western foothills to the Asir escarpment.

Demographics

Governorates 
The region is divided into sixteen governorates (with 2010 Census populations
Abha (+366,551)
Muhayil (+228,979)
An-Namas (+54,119)
Billasmar (+34,080)
Billahmar (+25,709)
Balqarn
Bareq (+74,391)
Bishah (+205,346)
Khamis Mushayt (+512,599)
Rijal Alma (+65,406)
Zahran Al-Janub (+63,119)
Tathlith (+59,188)
Sarat Abidah (+67,120)
Ahad Rifaydah (+113,043)
Al-Majardah (+103,531)

History 

In 25 B.C. Aelius Gallus marched his legions south from Egypt on a 1,300-mile expedition to take control of the ancient overland trade routes between the Mediterranean and what is now Hadhramaut in Yemen. The Romans wanted control of those routes because they were desperate for money and hoped to raise some by capturing Ma'rib, capital of Sabaʾ, and taking control of the trade in incense - then a priceless commodity - and other valuable aromatics. As it turned out, however, the expedition was a disaster and little information about ʿAsir emerged.

By 1920, however, the founder of Saudi Arabia Ibn Saud had begun to recoup the losses of the House of Saʿud and to unify most of the peninsula under his rule. As part of this campaign, he sent his Bedouin warriors also known as the Ikhwan to occupy ʿAsir, and the ruler of the region, Hasan Al Idrissi, had to leave. Therefore, he asked for protection from Imam Yahya, the ruler of Yemen and went there. From then on ʿAsir has been controlled by the House of Saud, a situation formalized in 1934 with the signing of the Treaty of Taʾif between Saudi Arabia and Yemen. Even then the region was still largely unknown to the West. In 1932, St John Philby, one of the first Europeans to explore and map the peninsula, did enter ʿAsir, but as he did not publish his observations until 1952, the area remained one of the blank spots on the world's map. In 1935 ʿAsir was made a separate governorate.

Economy 
Historically, ʿAsir was known for producing coffee, wheat, alfalfa, barley, senna, and frankincense. Wheat was grown in the summer and sesame has been grown in wetter areas of the region. Straw was used to make mats, hats, and baskets. Tribes in the area also wove tents from straw.

Development project 
In 2019, the Saudi government launched an infrastructure development project in ʿAsir Region. The project is expected to cost more than 1 billion Saudi Riyals. The provided projects will include health care, transportation and municipal services. The project is in line with the Saudi Vision 2030 to diversify non-petroleum income and activate new resources in Saudi Arabia.

List of governors
 Turki bin Ahmed Al Sudairi (1900s–8 June 1969)
 Fahd bin Saad bin Abdul Rahman (8 June 1969–1971)
 Khalid bin Faisal (1971–2007)
 Faisal bin Khalid (2007–2018)
 Turki bin Talal (2018–present)

See also

 Arabian Nubian Shield
 Habala
 Sarat Ubaida Governorate
 South Arabia
 Saleh Al-Qadhi
 Tihamah

References 

  Updated Edition; Norton Paperback; pbk.

External links 

 
 Asir National Park: Splendid Arabia, An Online Guide to the Kingdom of Saudi Arabia

 
Asir